The black-browed triller (Lalage atrovirens) is a species of bird in the family Campephagidae. It is found in northern New Guinea. Its natural habitats are subtropical or tropical moist lowland forests and subtropical or tropical mangrove forests. The Biak triller (L. leucoptera) was formerly considered a subspecies.

References

black-browed triller
Birds of New Guinea
black-browed triller
black-browed triller
Taxonomy articles created by Polbot